Simmie O. Cobbs Jr. (born August 25, 1995) is an American football wide receiver who is a free agent. He played college football at Indiana, and was signed by the Washington Redskins as an undrafted free agent in 2018.

Early years
Cobbs attended Oak Park and River Forest High School in Oak Park, Illinois. He originally committed to Purdue University to play college football but changed his commitment to Indiana University.

College career
As a freshman, Cobbs started all 12 games of the season. Cobbs recorded 114 receiving yards, with no touchdowns. His longest reception was for 34 yards against Indiana State. Due to Cobbs status as a freshman, as well as competing with teammate and future-NFL player Shane Wynn for receptions, Cobbs overall numbers were limited.

Cobbs took a medical redshirt in 2016 after player in only one game that season due to an ankle injury. After his redshirt junior season in 2017, Cobbs entered the 2018 NFL Draft. During his career, he had 139 receptions for 1,990 yards and 12 touchdowns. He is also tied for fourth in Indiana history with seven 100-yard games.

Professional career

Washington Redskins
Cobbs signed with the Washington Redskins as an undrafted free agent following the 2018 NFL Draft.
On September 1, 2018, he was waived for final roster cuts before the start of the season, but signed to the team's practice squad the next day.

New Orleans Saints
On December 14, 2018, Cobbs was signed by the New Orleans Saints off the Redskins practice squad. He was placed on injured reserve on January 12, 2019.

Cobbs was waived during final roster cuts on August 30, 2019.

Dallas Renegades
Cobbs was signed by the Dallas Renegades of the XFL during training camp. He was waived during final roster cuts on January 22, 2020.

DC Defenders
Cobbs was claimed off waivers by the DC Defenders on January 22, 2020. He had his contract terminated when the league suspended operations on April 10, 2020.

On November 17, 2022, Cobbs was drafted by the DC Defenders, returning back to his old team from the 2020 XFL season.

References

External links
Indiana Hoosiers bio
Washington Redskins bio

1995 births
Living people
Sportspeople from Oak Park, Illinois
Players of American football from Illinois
American football wide receivers
Indiana Hoosiers football players
Washington Redskins players
New Orleans Saints players
Dallas Renegades players
DC Defenders players